Hippopotamomus is the fifth studio album by British musician Momus, released in 1991 through Creation Records.

The album's third track, "Michelin Man", caused Momus to be threatened with legal action by the Michelin tyre company. They were angered by his use of their mascot, the aforementioned Michelin Man, an anthropomorphic pile of rubber inner-tubes, as a metaphor for hypersexual rubber fetishism. As a result, all unsold copies of the album were destroyed and future pressings of the album omitted the song from the album.

Reception 
The album received mixed reviews from critics. Melody Maker'''s Sharon O'Connell compared the album to the work of Serge Gainsbourg, speculating that the title referenced Gainsbourg's scatological, wordplay-heavy song "L'Hippopodame". Select's Ted Kessler gave the album a positive review, calling it "wickedly seductive". Critics generally noted the album's overwhelmingly sexual themes.NME's Betty Page panned the album, giving it a rating of 0/10, labelling Momus a "perv" and "anal retentive", and taking issue with the album's themes of cannibalism, violence against women, pornography, pedophilia, and extreme sexual practices. The controversy stemming from Page's review would later serve as the basis for Amongst Women Only'', a 1991 documentary directed by Nicholas Triandafyllidis centred on Momus' relations with women and accusations of misogyny raised against him.

Track listing

References

Momus (musician) albums
1991 albums
Creation Records albums